Elf Toljander (Finnish: Tonttu Toljanteri) is a Finnish Christmas themed television show for children that was broadcast by Yle TV2. It was first presented in 1998. Yle TV2 made new episodes in 1999, 2000, 2003, 2007, 2010, 2011 and 2013. One episode is about 5-15 minutes long, depending on the year. 

A CD titled "Kukahan se kaikki keinot keksii?" (roughly translated Whoever will come up with all the solutions?) was released in 2001. In 2003, a movie called "Tonttu Toljanterin joulumieli" (Elf Toljanders Christmas Spirit) was released.

Cast
 Elf Toljander (Finnish: Tonttu Toljanteri) by Kunto Ojansivu
 Santa Claus (Finnish: Joulupukki) by Jukka Pääkkönen (1998–2011) and Ilkka A. Jokinen (2013)
 Mrs. Santa Claus (Finnish: Joulumuori) by Satu Säävälä
 Doctor Pancake (Finnish: Lääkäri Lettu) by Kirsi Laamanen
 Elf Viänänen of Kuopio (Finnish: Kuopion Tonttu Viänänen) by Erkki Teittinen
 Electrician Elf (Finnish: Sähkömiestonttu) by Jussi Rekonen
 Hilda Häkkyrä & Mesh Fell's Selma (Finnish: Hilda Häkkyrä & Silmätunturin Selma) by

Seasons

Tonttu Toljanterin joulupulma (1998)  

On December 1st Toljander accidentally hits Santa Claus with ladder causing him to lose his memory. Toljander tries to hide this by keeping everyone away from Santa Claus and doing all Santa's work. Toljander falls in love with Doctor Pancake, but is too shy to say anything. When the last moment approaches and Santa Claus should leave for his trip to distribute the presents, Toljander accidentally hits Santa Claus again with the ladder and he gets his memory back.

Tonttu Toljanterin tarinoita (1999) 
Instead of the advent calendar format, this season has just 10 episodes that were broadcast weekly.

Tonttulan elämää (2000) 
This season continues with the weekly episode format.

Episodes 
 Reilun pelin säännöt
 Toljanterin korvatulehdus
 Eksyksissä
 Lentsuja Tonttulassa
 Talven riemuja
 Kielivaikeuksia
 Tonttulan Pavarotti
 Kadonneet lahjat
 Saunova poro
 Hilda lähtee Kiinaan

Tonttu Toljanterin Tonttu-TV (2003) 

This season marks the return to the usual advent calendar format.

Elf Hilda complains that the kids are going wild. Santa Claus starts a new TV program that does not mention the word "Christmas". "Let Christmas come into our hearts little by little, day by day and by night," says Santa Claus. Toljander is selected as the star of the show.

Tonttu Toljanteri muorin töissä 
Mrs. Claus gets sick with sleepbug (unipöpö), which affects elves who have been working overtime for over 500 years. Toljander takes Mrs. Claus into his sleep place, and tells no one to enter, claiming that a Christmas bogeyman lives there . Toljander takes care of all the Mrs. Claus's work, and always comes up with a reason why Mrs. Claus is not reachable. He does not want create panic when they hear she is sick.

Oikean joulun salaisuus (2010) 

Santa and Mrs. Claus wait for a specialist to arrive to help them modernize Christmas. Elf Toljander is horrified by the idea; there is nothing wrong with Christmas as it is!

Tonttu Toljanterin tuhmaikä (2011) 
Toljander is bit by an angry bee (äkäampiainen), that causes him to enter the naughty age. Toljander tries to hide his naughty age from the other elfs, since it's not usual for an elf more than 100 years old to be affected by it.

Tonttu Toljanteri tonttujen tonttuna (2013) 

Elf Toljander has to take the role of the elf that usually checks if the other elves have been naughty or nice, when he discovers the map of hiding places for the elf that usually does the job. He also has to investigate why Santa's toy storage has been unusually empty this year. Is there someone stealing the toys?

More information
YLEn Elävä arkisto: Tonttu Toljanteri muorin töissä (Finnish)
YLEn Elävä arkisto: Tonttu Toljanterin joulumieli (Finnish)

Finnish children's television series
Christmas television series